The Queen of the Channel is a title bestowed on the woman who has completed more successful swims of the English Channel than any other. It is held by Chloë McCardel with a total of 44 swims.

List of Queen of the Channel

See also

 List of sports awards honoring women

References

Swimming awards
 
Lists of female swimmers
Sports awards honoring women